The Subaru FA engine is a gasoline boxer-4 engine used in Subaru and Toyota automobiles. It is a derivative of the FB engine, with efforts to reduce weight while maintaining durability as the main design goals. Although the FA and FB engines share a common platform, the FA shares very little in dedicated parts with the FB engine, with a different block, head, connecting rods, and pistons.

Development
The FA series engine was developed for the Subaru BRZ and the first FA engine, the FA20D, was designed to be mounted as low as possible and to minimize the polar moment of the chassis to improve dynamic response and handling. The FA engine features a shallower oil pan and shorter intake manifold to reduce overall engine height compared to the Subaru FB engine. The FA and FB engines share few parts.

A direct injection-only turbo variant of the FA20, the FA20F, was introduced in late 2012 with the 2012 Legacy GT (for the Japanese market) and in the United States, the 2014 model year Subaru Forester. Compression ratio for the turbo engine falls to 10.6:1 from 12.5:1 for the FA20D. A revised variant of the FA20F was introduced for the 2015 model year Subaru WRX; in this application, the camshafts, rocker arms, boost pressure, intercooler, and exhaust were revised to increase peak output.

FA20 

Compared to the FB20 engine, which is undersquare with an  bore and stroke for  swept displacement, the FA20 is perfectly square with an  bore and stroke for  swept displacement. The  bore and stroke are also reminders of the heritage Toyota model AE86.

Common parameters for all FA20 variants
 Displacement: 
 Bore: 
 Stroke:

FA20D

The FA20D features both direct and port injection (Toyota's D-4S injection system) and Subaru AVCS variable valve timing system. It is used in the Subaru BRZ, and is identified by a Toyota engine family code known as the 4U-GSE, which is installed in the Toyota 86 and the Scion FR-S. According to Subaru, 0W-20 oil is recommended.

Wards Auto put the FA20D on their "10 Best Engines" list for 2013.

 Compression Ratio: 12.5:1
 Application: 2012-2016 Subaru BRZ/Toyota GT86
 Power:  at 7,000 RPM
 Torque:  at 6,400-6,600 RPM
 Application: 2017-2020 Subaru BRZ/Toyota GT86 (manual transmission)
Power:  at 7,000 RPM
Torque:  at 6,400 RPM

FA20F

A version with Subaru's own direct fuel injection and twin-scroll turbocharger was introduced in 2012. Also known as the FA20DIT. The FA20F was named to the Wards Auto "10 best engines" list in 2015 and 2016.

 Compression Ratio: 10.6:1
 Assembly: Oizumi, Japan
 Firing Order: 1-3-2-4
 2012-2014 JDM Subaru Legacy 2.0GT DIT, 2014+ Subaru Levorg and 2015+ JDM Subaru WRX S4
 Power:  at 5,600 RPM 
 Torque:  at 2,000-4,800 RPM
 2014-2018 USDM Subaru Forester badged as Forester XT:
 Power:  at 5,600 RPM
 Torque:  at 2,000-4,800 RPM
 2014-2018 JDM Subaru Forester badged as Forester XT:
 Power:  at 5,600 RPM
 Torque:  at 2,000-5,200 rpm
 2015-2021 USDM Subaru WRX:
 Power:  at 5,600 RPM
 Torque:  at 2,000-5,200 RPM
 Rev Limit: 6700 RPM

FA24

Common parameters for all FA24 variants
 Displacement: 
 Bore: 
 Stroke:

FA24F

The FA24F was introduced in 2018 initially for the 2019 model year Subaru Ascent. The engine has an all aluminum head and block in order to keep weight and warm-up times low. Direct injection and a turbocharger are used to provide output comparable to a 6-cylinder naturally aspirated engine, and the FA24 uses "regular" (87 AKI) fuel. At the 2019 Chicago Auto Show, Subaru unveiled the 2020 model year Subaru Legacy sedan, available starting in fall 2019 and featuring the FA24 as the uplevel engine option. The 2020 model year Subaru Outback also featured the FA24 as the uplevel option.

Compression Ratio: 10.6:1
2019+ USDM Subaru Ascent, 2020+ USDM Subaru Legacy badged as Legacy XT, and 2020+ USDM Subaru Outback badged as Outback XT
Power:  at 5,600 RPM
Torque:  at 2,000-4,800 RPM

2022+ Subaru WRX
Power:  at 5,600 RPM
Torque:  at 2,000-4,800 RPM

2022+ Subaru Levorg/WRX Sportswagon/WRX GT

FA24D

Like the preceding FA20D, the FA24D uses the Toyota D-4S fuel injection system, which combines direct and port injection. It has the same displacement as the FA24F turbocharged engine with an identical 94×86 mm bore and stroke, but the compression level is increased to 12.5:1. Fitting the existing FA24F, with its bottom-mounted turbo, to the second generation Subaru BRZ/Toyota 86 would have required raising the price and overall center of gravity, so natural aspiration was chosen instead. The torque curve was revised, with peak torque coming at a lower engine speed in the FA24D, and without the significant torque decrease between 3,000–5,000 RPM exhibited by the FA20D, which resulted from tuning that engine for fuel economy. In addition, an oil cooler has been added to the engine. One important difference is that the 2022 Toyota GR86 engine requires an oil that meets the  ILSAC GF-5 standard while the 2023 GR86 engine requires  ILSAC GF-6A.

Compression Ratio: 12.5:1
2022+ Subaru BRZ/Toyota GR86
Power:  at 7,000 RPM
Torque:  at 3,700 RPM

References

External links

()
 
 
 
 
 
 

Subaru engines
Boxer engines
Gasoline engines by model
Four-cylinder engines